Mariano Vázquez (born 20 December 1992) is an Argentine professional footballer who plays as a midfielder for Saudi Arabian club Al-Faisaly.

Professional career
Vázquez began playing football as an amateur in Argentina, before moving to Colombia. Vázquez made his professional debut with Atlético Huila in a 1-0 Categoría Primera A loss to Atlético Junior on 31 January 2016. He most recently plays for Fortaleza in Brazil.

On 7 January 2023, Vázquez joined Saudi Arabian club Al-Faisaly on a six-month contract.

Honours
Fortaleza
Campeonato Cearense: 2020, 2021

References

External links
 
 

1992 births
Living people
Sportspeople from Mar del Plata
Argentine footballers
Association football midfielders
Club Atlético Alvarado players
Atlético Huila footballers
Atlético Nacional footballers
Fortaleza Esporte Clube players
FBC Melgar footballers
Al-Faisaly FC players
Torneo Federal A players
Categoría Primera A players
Campeonato Brasileiro Série A players
Peruvian Primera División players
Saudi First Division League players
Argentine expatriate footballers
Argentine expatriates in Brazil
Argentine expatriates in Colombia
Argentine expatriates in Saudi Arabia
Expatriate footballers in Brazil
Expatriate footballers in Colombia
Expatriate footballers in Peru
Expatriate footballers in Saudi Arabia